The following is a list of notable ice speed skaters. The list is sorted by speed skating discipline (long track or short track), gender and competing nationality.

Long track

Male

American

 Andrew Astalos
 Ryan Bedford
 K. C. Boutiette
 Kip Carpenter
 Joey Cheek
 Rense Sam George
 Shani Davis
 John Farrell
 Casey FitzRandolph
 Eric Flaim
 Tucker Fredricks
 Chad Hedrick
 Eric Heiden
 Ken Henry
 Irving Jaffee
 Dan Jansen
 Charles Jewtraw
 Jonathan Kuck
 Charles Ryan Leveille
 Trevor Marsicano
 Terry McDermott
 Peter Mueller
 Apolo Ohno
 Derek Parra
 Tom Plant
 Andy Roesch
 JR Selski
 Jack Shea
 Nick Thometz

Australian
 Colin Coates
 Michael Everret Hearn (speed skater)
 Colin Hickey
 Danny Kah
 Kenneth Kennedy
 Michael Richmond
 Phillip Tahmindjis

Austrian
 Roland Brunner
 Christian Eminger
 Michael Hadschieff
 Werner Jäger
 Heinz Steinberger

Belarusian
 Igor Zhelezovski (also competed for Soviet Union)

Belgian
 Bart Veldkamp (also competed in the Netherlands)
 Bart Swings

British
 Bryan Carbis
 Julian Green
 Wilf O'Reilly

Canadian
 Andrew Barron
 Gaétan Boucher
 Sylvain Bouchard
 Arne Dankers
 Steven Elm
 Mike Ireland
 Patrick Kelly
 Neal Marshall
 Denny Morrison
 Jason Parker
 Kevin Scott
 Justin Warsylewicz
 Jeremy Wotherspoon

Colombian
 Pedro Causil

Czech
 Milan Sáblík

Dutch
 Henk Angenent
 Jan Bazen
 Jeen van den Berg
 Jelmer Beulenkamp
 Ted-Jan Bloemen (also competed for Canada)
 Jan Blokhuijsen
 Lieuwe de Boer
 Jan Bols
 Jan Bos
 Thomas Bos
 Kees Broekman
 Pieter Bruinsma
 Ben van der Burg
 Jappie van Dijk
 Hilbert van der Duim
 Jaap Eden
 Henk van der Grift
 Stefan Groothuis
 Hans van Helden (also competed for France)
 Martin Hersman
 Wouter olde Heuvel
 Bob de Jong
 
 Gerard Kemkers
 Piet Kleine
 Coen de Koning
 Sven Kramer
 Yep Kramer
 Harm Kuipers
 Simon Kuipers
 Jakko Jan Leeuwangh
 Rudie Liebrechts
 Michel Mulder
 Ronald Mulder
 Beorn Nijenhuis
 Tom Prinsen
 Ids Postma
 Rintje Ritsma
 Gianni Romme
 Frits Schalij
 Ard Schenk
 Jan Smeekens
 Mark Tuitert
 Jochem Uytdehaage
 Gerard van Velde
 Bart Veldkamp (also competed for Belgium)
 Hein Vergeer
 Carl Verheijen
 Kees Verkerk
 Koen Verweij
 Leo Visser
 Erben Wennemars
 Jan Ykema
 Falko Zandstra

Finnish
 Janne Hänninen
 Juhani Järvinen
 Pekka Koskela
 Pertti Niittylä
 Urpo Pikkupeura
 Mika Poutala
 Jukka Salmela
 Toivo Salonen
 Julius Skutnabb
 Clas Thunberg
 Jarmo Valtonen
 Jouko Vesterlund

French
Alexis Contin
Jean-Noël Fagot
Hans van Helden (also competed for the Netherlands)
Anne Koszul
Thierry Lamberton
Emmanuel Michon
Tonny Monari  (also competed for the Netherlands)

German

 Frank Dittrich (also competed for DDR)
 Jens Boden
 Uwe-Jens Mey (also competed for DDR)
 Samuel Schwarz
 Olaf Zinke (also competed for DDR)

DDR (East German)

 Andreas Ehrig
 André Hoffmann
 Uwe-Jens Mey

BRD (West German)

 Erhard Keller

Japanese
 Toru Aoyanagi
 Manabu Horii
 Junichi Inoue
 Joji Kato
 Yoshihiro Kitazawa
 Akira Kuroiwa
 Michiko Kuroiwa
 Toshiyuki Kuroiwa
 Yasunori Miyabe
 Yukinori Miyabe
 Hiroyasu Shimizu
 Keiichi Suzuki
 Miyuki Toda

Korean

DPRK (North Korean)

ROK (South Korean)

 Joo Hyong-jun (also competes short track)
 Kim Cheol-min (also competes short track)
 Lee Kang-seok
 Lee Kyou-hyuk
 Mo Tae-bum

Italian
 Enrico Fabris
 Maurizio Marchetto
 Mirko Giacomo Nenzi
 Ippolito Sanfratello
 Roberto Sighel

Kazakh
 Vadim Sayutin (also competed for Russia)

Mexican
 Eric Kraan

Norwegian
 Nils Aaness
 Roald Aas
 Hjalmar Andersen
 Petter Andersen
 Terje Andersen
 Ivar Ballangrud
 Håvard Bøkko
 Thomas Byberg
 Armand Carlsen
 Jørn Didriksen
 Lasse Efskind
 Kai Arne Engelstad
 Ivar Eriksen
 Eskil Ervik
 Bernt Evensen
 Rolf Falk-Larssen
 Sverre Farstad
 Dag Fornæss
 Alv Gjestvang
 Øystein Grødum
 Roar Grønvold
 Rudolf Gundersen
 Per Willy Guttormsen
 Villy Haugen
 Sverre Ingolf Haugli
 Finn Helgesen
 Knut Johannesen
 Arne Johansen
 Geir Karlstad
 Johann Olav Koss
 Roald Larsen
 Reidar Liaklev
 Odd Lundberg
 Fred Anton Maier
 Charles Mathiesen
 Oscar Mathisen
 Per Ivar Moe
 Alfred Næss
 Peder Østlund
 Tom Erik Oxholm
 Frode Rønning
 Lasse Sætre
 Amund Sjøbrend
 Ådne Søndrål
 Michael Staksrud
 Sten Stensen
 Kay Arne Stenshjemmet
 Rune Stordal
 Kjell Storelid
 Jan Egil Storholt
 Harald Strøm
 Kristian Strøm
 Roger Strøm
 Arnulf Sunde
 Magne Thomassen
 Erik Vea
 Even Wetten

Polish
 Zbigniew Bródka

Russian

 Natalja Bakina
 Dmitry Dorofeyev
 Aleksandr Golubev (also competed for Soviet Union)
 Dmitry Lobkov
 Dmitry Shepel
 Ivan Skobrev
 Aleksey Yesin
 Denis Yuskov

Soviet

 Ants Antson
 Vladimir Belov
 Andrey Bobrov
 Dmitry Bochkaryov
 Oleg Bozhev
 Sergey Fokichev
 Oleg Goncharenko
 Yevgeny Grishin
 Nikolay Gulyayev
 Vasily Ippolitov
 Sergey Klevchenya
 Sergey Khlebnikov
 Viktor Kosichkin
 Yevgeny Kulikov
 Vladimir Lobanov
 Viktor Lyoskin
 Igor Malkov
 Sergey Marchuk
 Eduard Matusevich
 Yuri Mikhaylov
 Valery Muratov
 Dmitry Ogloblin
 Pavel Pegov
 Dimitry Sakunenko
 Viktor Shasherin
 Boris Shilkov
 Vladimir Shilykovsky
 Boris Stenin
 Nikolay Strunnikov

Swedish
 Nils van der Poel
 Per Bengtsson
 Göran Claeson
 Sigvard Ericsson
 Tomas Gustafson
 Johnny Höglin
 Hans Markström
 Jonny Nilsson
 Johan Röjler
 Örjan Sandler
 Jonas Schön
 Åke Seyffarth
 Mats Wallberg

Swiss

 Franz Krienbühl
 Notger "Nök" Ledergerber
 Roger Schneider

Female

American 
 Chantal Bailey
 Bonnie Blair
 Rebekah Bradford
 Beth Heiden
 Anne Henning
 Dianne Holum
 Kit Klein
 Maria Lamb
 Leah Poulos-Mueller
 Jennifer Rodriguez
 Chris Witty
 Sheila Young
 Ellie Ochowicz
 Catherine Raney
 Heather Richardson-Bergsma
 Nancy Swider
 Christine Witty

Austrian
 Emese Antal (born in Romania)
 Emese Hunyady (also competed for Hungary)

Canadian
 Susan Auch
 Ivanie Blondin
 Lela Brooks
 Sylvia Burka
 Sylvie Daigle
 Eden Donatelli
 Kristina Groves
 Clara Hughes
 Gilmore Junio
 Cindy Klassen
 Catriona Le May Doan
 Christine Nesbitt
 Shannon Rempel
 Brittany Schussler

Czech
 Martina Sáblíková

Danish
 Cathrine Grage

Dutch
 Margot Boer
 Annie Borckink
 Wieteke Cramer
 Paulien van Deutekom
 Carry Geijssen
 Yvonne van Gennip
 Annette Gerritsen
 Renate Groenewold
 Tonny de Jong
 Stien Kaiser
 Atje Keulen-Deelstra
 Marrit Leenstra
 Barbara de Loor
 Jorien ter Mors
 Laurine van Riessen
 Ans Schut
 Gretha Smit
 Marianne Timmer
 Diane Valkenburg
 Lotte van Beek
 Renske Vellinga
 Marja Vis
 Ria Visser
 Elma de Vries
 Linda de Vries
 Ireen Wüst

Finnish

 Kaija Mustonen

German
 Daniela Anschütz-Thoms
 Stephanie Beckert
 Jacqueline Börner (also competed for DDR)
 Anni Friesinger-Postma
 Monique Garbrecht-Enfeldt (also competed for DDR)
 Bente Kraus
 Gunda Niemann-Stirnemann (also competed for DDR)
 Claudia Pechstein (also competed for DDR)
 Christa Luding-Rothenburger (also competed for DDR)
 Franziska Schenk (also competed for DDR)
 Sabine Völker (also competed for DDR)
 Jenny Wolf

DDR (East German)
 Karin Enke
 Andrea Ehrig-Mitscherlich
 Helga Haase
 Constanze Moser-Scandolo
 Gabi Zange

BRD (West German)
 Monika Pflug

Japanese
 Seiko Hashimoto
 Rieko Kaji
 Tomomi Okazaki

Korean

DPRK (North Korean)
 Han Pil-Hwa

ROK (South Korean)
 Lee Sang-hwa

Mongolian
 Dalanbayar Delgermaa

Norwegian

 Hege Bøkko
 Maren Haugli
 Edel Therese Høiseth
 Bjørg Eva Jensen
 Synnøve Lie
 Laila Schou Nilsen

Russian

 Svetlana Bazhanova
 Svetlana Zhurova

Soviet
 Inga Artamonova
 Tatyana Averina
 Vera Bryndzei
 Maria Isakova
 Natalya Petrusyova
 Tamara Rylova
 Lidia Skoblikova
 Nina Statkevich
 Valentina Stenina
 Galina Stepanskaya
 Lyudmila Titova
 Rimma Zhukova

Swedish
 Jasmin Krohn

Swiss
 Sylvia Brunner

Short track

Male

American
 Apolo Anton Ohno
 JR Celski
 Dan Weinstein
 Anthony Lobello Jr
 Jordan Malone
 Simon Cho
 Rusty Smith
 Alex Izykowski
 Ryan Bedford
 Travis Jayner
 J. P. Kepka
 Kyle Uyehara
 Charles King
 Keith King

Australian

 Steven Bradbury

British

 Wilf O'Reilly

Canadian

 Eric Bedard
 Gaétan Boucher
 Marc Gagnon
 Michael Gilday
 Jonathan Guilmette
 Charles Hamelin
 François Hamelin
 François-Louis Tremblay
 Mathieu Turcotte
 Guillaume Bastille
 Olivier Jean
Gilmore Junio

Chinese

 Li Jiajun

Dutch

 Lieuwe de Boer

Korean

DPRK (North Korean)
 Choe Un-song
 Jong Kwang-bom

ROK (South Korean)

 Ahn Hyun Soo
 Ahn Viktor (also competed for Russia)
 Chae Ji-hoon
 Hwang Dae-heon
 Joo Hyong-jun (also competes long track)
 Kim Byeong-jun
 Kim Cheol-min (also competes long track)
 Kim Do-kyoum
 Kim Dong-sung
 Kim Hwan-ee
 Kim Hyun-kon
 Kim Ki-hoon
 Kim Seoung-il
 Kim Tae-hoon
 Kim Yun-jae
 Kwak Yoon-gy
 Lee Han-bin
 Lee Ho-eung
 Lee Ho-Suk
 Lee Joon-ho
 Lee Jun-hwan
 Lee June-seo
 Lee Jung-Su
 Lee Seung-hoon
 Lim Hyo-jun
 Min Ryoung
 Mo Ji-soo
 Noh Jin-kyu
 Oh Se-jong
 Park Ji-won
 Park Se-yeong
 Seo Ho-Jin
 Seo Yi-ra
 Sin Da-woon
 Song Jae-kun
 Song Kyung-taek
 Song Suk-Woo
 Sung Si-Bak
 Um Cheon-ho

New Zealand

 Mike McMillen
 Andrew Nicholson
 Chris Nicholson
 Tony Smith
 Matt Fuller
 Blake Skjellerup

Female

American

 Katherine Reutter
 Allison Baver
 Kimberly Derrick
 Carly Wilson
 Lana Gehring
 Alyson Dudek
 Cathy Turner

Bulgarian

 Evgenia Radanova

Canadian

 Susan Auch
 Sylvie Daigle
 Marie-Ève Drolet
 Jessica Gregg
 Alanna Kraus
 Anouk Leblanc-Boucher
 Valérie Maltais
 Amanda Overland
 Kalyna Roberge
 Marianne St-Gelais
 Tania Vicent

Chinese

 Wang Meng
 Yang Yang (A)
 Yang Yang (S)

Korean

DPRK (North Korean)

 Hwang Ok-sil
 Kim Chun-hwa
 Ri Hyang-mi

ROK (South Korean)
 An Sang-mi
 Byun Chun-sa
 Cho Ha-ri
 Choi Eun-kyung
 Choi Min-kyung
 Chun Lee-kyung
 Jeon Da-hye
 Jeon Ji-soo
 Jin Sun-Yu
 Joo Min-jin
 Jung Eun-ju
 Kim Alang
 Kim Min-jee
 Ko Gi-hyun
 Park Seung-hi
 Shim Suk-hee
 Noh Ah-Reum

Lists of sportspeople by sport
 
Speed skating-related lists